Albert Donald Spangler (born July 8, 1933) is a retired American Major League Baseball outfielder and coach.

High school and college career 
Spangler, nicknamed "Spanky", attended Philadelphia's Olney High School. After turning down a professional contract offer from the Chicago White Sox, he was slated to attend Lafayette College in Easton, Pennsylvania, with a full scholarship, but he decided to attend Duke University. He was an All-American college selection after his junior year as Blue Devil, thanks to his .406 batting average.

Professional career 
Not quite four weeks before his 21st birthday, Spangler signed as a free agent with the Braves on June 14, 1954. He made his MLB debut on September 16, and would go on to play his final game on September 11, .

He was the Colt. 45s' starting center fielder in the club's first major-league game, played against the Cubs on April 10, . Batting second in the order, he drove in the first run in franchise history with a RBI triple in the bottom of the first inning off Cubs' starting pitcher Don Cardwell, knocking in teammate Bob Aspromonte. His .285 mark during the Colt .45s' maiden season was second by .001 to fellow outfielder Román Mejías' .286, but the following year Spangler was the team's batting average leader at .281 in 120 games played.

Released by the Angels on February 13, Spangler signed with the Cubs as a free agent three days later. On June 12, he hit two home runs and drove in four runs in a 12 to 6 victory over the Atlanta Braves.

On August 30, 1971, he was added to the team's active list, and pinch hit five times during the month of September, garnering two hits. That brief stint concluding his MLB career. In his 912 games played, Spangler batted .262 with 21 career home runs and 175 runs batted in. His 594 hits also included 87 doubles and 26 triples. 

Spangler remained with the Cubs' organization for another three seasons; he managed in their farm system in 1972 and 1973, then returned to their big-league coaching staff in 1974 for a final season.

References

External links

 Retrosheet

1933 births
Living people
Baseball players from Philadelphia
California Angels players
Chicago Cubs coaches
Chicago Cubs players
Duke Blue Devils baseball players
Evansville Braves players
Houston Astros players
Houston Colt .45s players
Jacksonville Braves players
Los Angeles Angels players
Louisville Colonels (minor league) players
Major League Baseball outfielders
Seattle Angels players
Tacoma Cubs players
Wichita Braves players